Democracy Watch may refer to:

 Democracy Watch (Canada)
 Iceland Democratic Party (Lýðræðisvaktin, 'Democracy Watch')